The 42nd Deauville American Film Festival took place at Deauville, France from September 2 to 11, 2016. American crime drama film The Infiltrator by Brad Furman was selected as the opening night film, while Black dramedy War Dogs by Todd Phillips served as the closing night film of the festival. The Grand Prix was awarded to Little Men by Ira Sachs.

The festival paid tribute to  James Franco, Michael Moore and Stanley Tucci. Chloë Grace Moretz and Daniel Radcliffe received Le Nouvel Hollywood (Hollywood Rising Star) awards.

Juries

Main Competition
Frédéric Mitterrand: French actor, director, screenwriter and politician (President of Jury) 
Françoise Arnoul: French actress
Éric Elmosnino: French actor and musician
Ana Girardot: French actress  
Douglas Kennedy: American novelist  
Radu Mihăileanu: French screenwriter and director  
Emmanuel Mouret: French actor, director and screenwriter  
Marjane Satrapi: French novelist

Cartier revelation jury
Audrey Pulvar: French journalist and TV host (President of Jury)  
Cédric Anger: French director and screenwriter
Jérôme Bonnell: French director
Kheiron: French actor and director 
Diane Rouxel: French actress
Christa Theret: French actress

Programme

Competition
Captain Fantastic by Matt Ross
Certain Women by Kelly Reichardt
Christine by Antonio Campos
Complete Unknown by Joshua Marston
Goat by Andrew Neel
Little Men by Ira Sachs
Mean Dreams by Nathan Morlando
Sing Street by John Carney
Teenage Cocktail by John Carchietta
The Fits by Anna Rose Holmer
The Free World by Jason Lew
The Transfiguration by Michael O'Shea
Transpecos by Greg Kwedar
Wiener-Dog by Todd Solondz

Les Premières (Premieres)
And So It Goes by Rob Reiner
Born to Be Blue by Robert Budreau
Collide by Eran Creevy
Eye in the Sky by Gavin Hood
Frank & Lola by Matthew Ross
Free State of Jones by Gary Ross
Hell or High Water by David Mackenzie
Imperium by Daniel Ragussis
In Dubious Battle by James Franco
The Infiltrator by Brad Furman
Kubo and the Two Strings by Travis Knight
Miles Ahead by Don Cheadle
Mississippi Grind by Anna Boden and Ryan Fleck
The History of Love by Radu Mihăileanu
War Dogs by Todd Phillips
War on Everyone by John Michael McDonagh

Les Docs De L'Oncle Sam (Uncle Sam's Doc)
Close Encounters with Vilmos Zsigmond by Pierre Filmon
Mapplethorpe: Look at the Pictures by Fenton Bailey and Randy Barbato
Midnight Return: The Story of Billy Hayes and Turkey by Sally Sussman Morina
Nuts! by Penny Lane
The Bandit by Jesse Moss
Where to Invade Next by Michael Moore
Women who run Hollywood by Julia Kuperberg and Clara Kuperberg

Television
The Night Of by Steven Zaillian and James Marsh

Awards

The festival awarded the following awards:
Grand Prix (Grand Special Prize): Little Men by Ira Sachs
Prix du Jury (Jury Special Prize): Captain Fantastic by Matt Ross and Wiener-Dog by Todd Solondz
Prix du Public (Audience Award): Captain Fantastic by Matt Ross
Prix de la Critique Internationale (International Critics' prize): The Fits by Anna Rose Holmer
Prix Michel d'Ornano (Michel d'Ornano Award for debut French film): Willy 1er by Ludovic Boukherma, Zoran Boukherma, Marielle Gautier and Hugo P. Thomas
Prix de la Révélation Cartier (Cartier Revelation Prize): Wiener-Dog by Todd Solondz
Lucien Barrière Prize for Literature:
West of Sunset by Stewart O'Nan
Tributes:
James Franco
Michael Moore
Stanley Tucci
Le Nouvel Hollywood (Hollywood Rising Star):
Chloë Grace Moretz
Daniel Radcliffe

References

External links
 Official site
 Deauville American Film Festival:2015 at Internet Movie Database

2016 in French cinema
2016 film festivals
2016 festivals in Europe
21st century in France
Film festivals in France